Bert Raymond Leboe (13 August 1909 – 11 December 1980) was a Social Credit party member of the House of Commons of Canada. Born in Bawlf, Alberta, he was a lumberman by career, becoming director of Leboe Brothers Sawmills Ltd.

He was first elected at the Cariboo riding in the 1953 general election and re-elected there in 1957. After a defeat in the 1958 federal election, Leboe returned to Parliament by winning the Cariboo riding in 1962, then was re-elected in 1963 and 1965. After the Cariboo riding was eliminated in a late-1960s electoral boundary realignment, Leboe was a candidate at Prince George—Peace River in the 1968 election where he was defeated by Robert Borrie of the Liberal party.

References

External links
 

1909 births
1980 deaths
20th-century Canadian businesspeople
Members of the House of Commons of Canada from British Columbia
Social Credit Party of Canada MPs
People from Bawlf, Alberta